Kalatop Khajjiar Sanctuary, or simply Kalatop Sanctuary, is a 30.69 km² animal sanctuary at Kalatop and Khajjiar in the Chamba district of Himachal Pradesh, India. The sanctuary area is well laid out for trekking trails both at Kalatop and Khajjiar. There is a dense deodar and fir forest covering 19.63 km² of the sanctuary, which is about 6 km from Dalhousie. Pheasants, serow and black bear are some of the common animals found here.
The sanctuary lies in the path of the Ravi River, and is surrounded by coniferous and oak forests.

Latitudinal range- 32°02´ to 32°04´ N
Longitudinal range- 76°01´ to 76°06´E
Nearest rail gauge- Pathankot (86 km).
Altitude- 1185 to 2768 m
Temperature- 10 to 35 °C
Mean annual rainfall-  672.3 mm.

Flora and fauna

The vegetation consists of blue pine and deodar forest, with oak. Undergrowth in the forest area is well developed.

Mammals- bear, Himalayan Black Marten, leopard, deer, Barking Goral, squirrel, serow, jackal, langur.
Birds- Blackbird
Birds
in this sanctuary, many Birds are found. some of them are listed below:-
1. Eurasian Jay
2. Whitewinged Black Bird
3. Black Headed Jay
4. Chesnut Billed Rock Thrush
5. Blackheaded Jay.
6. Grey Headed Cannery Flycatcher.

See also
List of protected areas of India
Protected areas of Himachal Pradesh
Wildlife sanctuaries of India

References

External links

himachaltourism.nic.in
hptdc.gov.in
Kalatop Wildlife Sanctuary

Wildlife sanctuaries in Himachal Pradesh
Chamba district
Geography of Chamba district
Protected areas with year of establishment missing